Roscommon Gaels GAA is a Gaelic Athletic Association club located in Roscommon in County Roscommon, Ireland.  The club provides teams for both hurling and Gaelic football.

History

The club was founded in 1959 as a result of a merger between two clubs, Eoghan Ruadhs & St. Comans. The club is a successor club to the numerous clubs that represented the Roscommon town area in the decades prior to this.

Prior to the development of its current club grounds at Lisnamult in the early 2000s, the club was based at Dr Hyde Park. In 2019 the club celebrated its 60th anniversary with the opening of new changing rooms at its Lisnamult grounds.

Honours

Hurling

Roscommon Senior Hurling Championships:
 1902, 1903, 1904, 1913, 1914, 1915, 1923, 1924, 1925, 1931, 1932, 1933, 1935, 1936, 1938, 1944, 1951, 1952, 1961, 1964, 1965, 1966, 1969, 1970
Connacht Senior Club Hurling Championships:
 Runners-Up 1970
Roscommon Under-21 Hurling Championship:
 2000

Football

All-Ireland Senior Club Football Championships:
Runners-Up: 1976

Connacht Senior Club Football Championships:

Winners: 1974, 1975
Runners-Up: 1998, 1999

Roscommon Senior Football Championships:

Winners: 1962, 1972, 1974, 1975, 1978, 1980, 1994, 1998, 1999, 2001, 2004
Runners-Up: 1964, 1969, 1970, 1976, 1977, 1985, 1992, 2017, 2019

References

External links
Roscommon Gaels GAA site

Gaelic games clubs in County Roscommon
Hurling clubs in County Roscommon
Gaelic football clubs in County Roscommon
Roscommon (town)